Nikolsk is a town and the administrative center of Nikolsky District in Penza Oblast, Russia, located on the Vyrgan River  northeast of Penza, the administrative center of the oblast. Population:

History
It was established in place of the villages of Nikolskoye, known since 1668, and Pestrovka, known since the 1680s. It was called Nikolo-Pestrovka in 1761 and was granted urban-type settlement status in 1928. It was granted town status in 1954.

Administrative and municipal status
Within the framework of administrative divisions, Nikolsk serves as the administrative center of Nikolsky District. As an administrative division, it is incorporated within Nikolsky District as the town of district significance of Nikolsk. As a municipal division, the town of district significance of Nikolsk is incorporated within Nikolsky Municipal District as Nikolsk Urban Settlement.

References

Notes

Sources

Cities and towns in Penza Oblast
Gorodishchensky Uyezd